Burford Lane Farmhouse is in Burford Lane in the village of Oughtrington, near Lymm, Cheshire, England.  It is recorded in the National Heritage List for England as a designated Grade II listed building.

The farmhouse was designed by the Chester architect John Douglas for George C. Dewhurst and built in 1866.  It is constructed in brown brick with some timber framing and a grey slate roof.  It is considered to be "one of the earliest identified farmhouses by Douglas" which "shows his neo-vernacular style in course of development".

See also

Listed buildings in Lymm
List of houses and associated buildings by John Douglas

References

Grade II listed buildings in Cheshire
Grade II listed houses
Houses completed in 1866
Houses in Cheshire
John Douglas buildings
Timber framed buildings in Cheshire
1866 establishments in England
Farmhouses in England